The 1993–94 George Mason Patriots Men's basketball team represented George Mason University during the 1993–94 NCAA Division I men's basketball season. This was the 28th season for the program, the first under head coach Paul Westhead. The Patriots played their home games at the Patriot Center in Fairfax, Virginia.

Honors and awards 

Colonial Athletic Association Rookie of the Year
 Curtis McCants

Colonial Athletic Association All-Rookie Team
 Curtis McCants
 Mike Sharp

Player statistics

Schedule and results

|-
!colspan=12 style=| Non-conference regular season

|-
!colspan=12 style=|CAA regular season

|-
!colspan=12 style=|1994 CAA tournament

References

George Mason Patriots men's basketball seasons
George Mason
George Mason men's basketball
George Mason men's basketball